The Council of CBSE Affiliated Schools in the Gulf, or CBSE Gulf Sahodaya is a body of 193 principals of Central Board of Secondary Education-affiliated schools in the member states of the Gulf Cooperation Council, namely Bahrain, Kuwait, Oman, Qatar, Saudi Arabia, and the United Arab Emirates.

Established in 1988, it intends to promote cooperation among member schools and conducts joint examinations for classes 9 and 11 annually besides organizing cultural, literary, educational, art, sport and other curricular activities and festivals. It also holds the annual Principals Conference to discuss and plan the progress and development of the member schools.

Organizational structure 
The council is divided into 6 chapters, each one representing a GCC member state.

 Bahrain Chapter of the Gulf Sahodaya
 Kuwait Chapter of the Gulf Sahodaya
 Oman Chapter of the Gulf Sahodaya
 Qatar Chapter of the Gulf Sahodaya 
 Saudi Arabia Chapter of the Gulf Sahodaya
 United Arab Emirates Chapter of the Gulf Sahodaya

References 

Central Board of Secondary Education
Education in the Middle East
Indian international schools in Asia
International school associations